Max Leslie Spencer (born 4 October 1997) is a former professional Australian rules footballer who played for the Gold Coast Football Club in the Australian Football League (AFL).

Early life
Spencer grew up playing his junior football on the Gold Coast for the Palm Beach Currumbin Australian Football Club alongside future AFL teammate Jesse Joyce and attended Palm Beach Currumbin High School in his teenage years.

AFL career
Spencer was a member of the Gold Coast Suns' academy from a young age and was drafted by Gold Coast as a Queensland zone selection as a pre-rookie draft selection in 2016. He made his AFL debut against  at Metricon Stadium in round 19 of the 2017 season. delisted at the end of  the 2018 season

References

1997 births
Living people
Gold Coast Football Club players
Werribee Football Club players
Australian rules footballers from Queensland